Thomas Vincent Dunlea (19 April 1894 – 22 August 1970) was an Irish-Australian Catholic priest known for his involvement in charitable works.

Early life
Dunlea was born in Ballina, Ireland, to  Michael and Bridget Dunlea. He attended primary school in Killaloe and High School at Mount St Joseph’s Monastery in Roscrea. In 1914 he entered the College of Mount Melleray, a Cistercian seminary. He was ordained a Roman Catholic priest on 20 June 1920.

Missionary in Australia
In 1920 he set off on the  arriving in Sydney, Australia in December.

Some of his appointments were:

1921	Mary Magdalene parish, Rose Bay
1922	Sutherland, Surrey Hills
1932	Newtown, Enfield, Golden Grove, Hurstville
1934	Sutherland
1951	Chaplain, Matthew Talbot Hostel for destitute men
1952-68	Hurstville

Founding of Boys' Town

In 1939 he started Boys' Town (Engadine), New South Wales based on Father Flanagan's  Boys Town, Nebraska, USA.

Involvement with Alcoholics Anonymous (AA)

In the late 1940s he was working among alcoholics with Dr Sylvester Minogue and Archibald McKinnon of the Darlinghurst reception house. For a time the pioneer Alcoholics Anonymous group met in the Boys' Town city office and at other locations found by Dunlea. A bush camp for alcoholics and a residential 'Christmas House' (opened on Christmas Day 1945) both collapsed, which seemed to prove that a controlled environment was not the answer to alcoholism. Boys' Town fund-raising functions had sharpened Dunlea's own drinking problems and he came to recognize that he himself was an alcoholic. In 1950 he took a year's leave of absence to wander around Australia.

On his return, Dunlea became chaplain to the Matthew Talbot Hostel for destitute men. There his listening kindness was given full stretch. In 1952 he went to Hurstville as parish priest, devoting his time to A.A., to a new organization for people with psychiatric problems, Recovery Group, as well as to a menagerie of odd animals.

'When Tom Dunlea doesn't take an interest in stray dogs any longer', he said, 'you'll know that he's had it'.

He died on 22 August 1970 in Lewisham Hospital and was buried in Woronora cemetery. The congregation which attended his reburial at Boys' Town on 7 September included a pet sheep and a stray dog.

Recognitions

In 1965 he was made a Commander of the Order of the British Empire (OBE). He also received the Jewish Cross of Honour and the Papal Cross of Honour Pro Ecclesia et Pontifice.

When Fr. Chris Riley started a detox centre, he named it the Dunlea Adolescent Alcohol and Other Drug Treatment Program.

In 2010 the name of Boys' Town (Engadine) was changed to the Dunlea Centre.

References

McSweeney, J. A welcome on the mat. OMP Publishers 2004.
Austen, M.; Richardson, M., Father Dunlea and Those with a Drinking Problem, Engadine, New South Wales, 1987.
Coleman, D., Priest of the Highway, Sydney, 1973.
Halliday, D., Father Dunlea's Approach to Dealing with Young People in Difficulties, Engadine, New South Wales, 1987.
McKinnon, A., They Chose Freedom, Bonnell's Bay, New South Wales, c.1985.
Edmund Campion, 'Dunlea, Thomas Vincent (1894–1970)', Australian Dictionary of Biography, Volume 14, Melbourne University Press, 1996, pp 56–57.

External links
 Boys Town (Engadine)
 More on Dunlea and AA

20th-century Australian Roman Catholic priests
20th-century Roman Catholic priests
1894 births
1970 deaths
Burials at Woronora Memorial Park
Irish emigrants (before 1923)
People educated at Cistercian College, Roscrea